The following is a list of Scheduled monuments in Greater London.

In the United Kingdom, a scheduled monument is a "nationally important" archaeological site or historic building that has been given protection against unauthorised change by being placed on a list (or "schedule") by the Secretary of State for Digital, Culture, Media and Sport (DCMS); Historic England takes the leading role in identifying such sites. Monuments are defined in the Ancient Monuments and Archaeological Areas Act 1979 and the National Heritage Act 1983. Scheduled monuments—sometimes referred to as scheduled ancient monuments—can also be protected through listed building procedures, and Historic England considers listed building status to be a better way of protecting buildings and standing structures. A scheduled monument that is later determined to "no longer merit scheduling" can be descheduled.

References

Greater London
Protected areas of London
Archaeological sites in London
Scheduled monuments in London
Monuments and memorials in London